Laxman Meena (born 17 June 1950) is an Indian Politician from the state of Rajasthan.

Meena is a member of the 15th Rajasthan Legislative Assembly from Bassi constituency.

References

Rajasthani politicians
Living people
Rajasthan MLAs 2018–2023
1950 births